is a Japanese para-badminton player who competes in international level events. At the 2020 Summer Paralympics, Sugino won a bronze medal in the women's singles and mixed doubles events. Sugino is also a former world champion in the women's singles SU5 discipline.

Personal life 
Sugino has a disability in her left arm. She encountered and started playing para-badminton when she was in high school and later competed in able-bodied tournaments.

Achievements

Paralympic Games 
Women's singles
Mixed doubles

World Championships 

Women's singles

Women's doubles

Mixed doubles

Asian Para Games 
Women's doubles

Mixed doubles

Asian Championships 
Women's doubles

Mixed doubles

BWF Para Badminton World Circuit (2 titles, 4 runners-up) 
The BWF Para Badminton World Circuit – Grade 2, Level 1, 2 and 3 tournaments has been sanctioned by the Badminton World Federation from 2022.

Women's singles

Mixed doubles

International Tournaments (7 titles, 8 runners-up) 
Women's singles

Women's doubles

Mixed doubles

References

Notes 

1990 births
Living people
People from Ichihara, Chiba
Sportspeople from Chiba Prefecture
Japanese female badminton players
Japanese para-badminton players
Paralympic badminton players of Japan
Badminton players at the 2020 Summer Paralympics
Paralympic medalists in badminton
Medalists at the 2020 Summer Paralympics
Paralympic bronze medalists for Japan
21st-century Japanese women